Carlisle is a town in Haddon Township, Sullivan County, in the U.S. state of Indiana. The population was 692 at the 2010 census. It is part of the Terre Haute Metropolitan Statistical Area. Carlisle is home to the Wabash Valley Correctional Facility.

History
Carlisle was named after the city of Carlisle, Pennsylvania. The Carlisle post office has been in operation since 1816.

Geography
Carlisle is located at  (38.962240, -87.400691).

Demographics

2010 census
As of the census of 2010, there were 692 people, 271 households, and 188 families living in the town. The racial makeup of the town was 97.1% White, 0.6% Native American, 1.9% from other races, and 0.4% from two or more races. Hispanic or Latino of any race were 2.7% of the population.

There were 271 households, of which 35.4% had children under the age of 18 living with them, 52.4% were married couples living together, 12.9% had a female householder with no husband present, 4.1% had a male householder with no wife present, and 30.6% were non-families. 28.4% of all households were made up of individuals, and 16.6% had someone living alone who was 65 years of age or older. The average household size was 2.55 and the average family size was 3.11.

The median age in the town was 38.2 years. 25.9% of residents were under the age of 18; 9.1% were between the ages of 18 and 24; 22.5% were from 25 to 44; 24.4% were from 45 to 64; and 18.2% were 65 years of age or older. The gender makeup of the town was 49.6% male and 50.4% female.

2000 census
As of the census of 2000, there were 2,660 people, 286 households, and 193 families living in the town. The racial makeup of the town, including prison population, was 63.68% White, 32.26% African American, 0.90% Native American, 0.08% Asian, 1.58% from other races, and 1.50% from two or more races. Hispanic or Latino of any race were 2.14% of the population.

There were 286 households, out of which 32.2% had children under the age of 18 living with them, 51.0% were married couples living together, 12.2% had a female householder with no husband present, and 32.5% were non-families. 30.1% of all households were made up of individuals, and 15.4% had someone living alone who was 65 years of age or older. The average household size was 2.40 and the average family size was 3.00.

In the town, the population was spread out, with 7.0% under the age of 18, 17.9% from 18 to 24, 53.9% from 25 to 44, 16.2% from 45 to 64, and 5.0% who were 65 years of age or older. The median age was 34 years. For every 100 females, there were 603.7 males. For every 100 females age 18 and over, there were 756.1 males.

The median income for a household in the town was $29,875, and the median income for a family was $36,250. Males had a median income of $28,207 versus $20,682 for females. The per capita income for the town was $12,822. About 12.0% of families and 13.4% of the population were below the poverty line, including 14.5% of those under age 18 and 9.8% of those age 65 or over.

Education
Carlisle has a public library, a branch of the Sullivan County Public Library.

Notable residents
John Wesley Davis, U.S. Congressman and Speaker of the House of Representatives

References

Towns in Sullivan County, Indiana
Towns in Indiana
Terre Haute metropolitan area